Corymbia aspera, commonly known as the rough-leaved ghost gum, rough leaf range gum, desert bloodwood, Brittle Range gum in Western Australia, or snappy gum in the Northern Territory is a species of tree that is endemic to northern Australia. It has smooth white bark, sometimes with a short stocking of rough bark near the base, a crown of sessile juvenile, heart-shaped or egg-shaped leaves, flower buds in groups of seven, creamy white flowers and cup-shaped, barrel-shaped or cylindrical fruit.

Description
It has smooth white, cream-coloured or grey bark, sometimes with flaky, tessellated bark at the base. The branchlets lack oil glands in the pith. Flowering occurs from October to December and the flowers are white or creamy white. The seeds are reddish brown, flattened to saucer-shaped.

Taxonomy and naming
The rough-leaved ghost gum was first formally described in 1859 by Ferdinand von Mueller in the Journal of the Proceedings of the Linnean Society, Botany and given the name Eucalyptus apsera. In 1995, Ken Hill and Lawrie Johnson changed the name to Corymbia aspera. The specific epithet (aspera) is from the Latin word asper meaning "rough to the touch".

Distribution and habitat
Corymbia aspera grows in low, open woodland on hills, ridges and plateaus as well as on floodplains in red sand, alluvium and skeletal soils. Its range extends from the Pilbara and Kimberley regions of Western Australia east through the Roper and McArthur River catchments in the Northern Territory and into Queensland as far east as the Selwyn Range to the south east of Cloncurry.

See also
 List of Corymbia species

References

aspera
Myrtales of Australia
Flora of Western Australia
Plants described in 1859
Taxa named by Ferdinand von Mueller